The 1957 United State Air Force incursion into Albanian airspace, was a Cold War incident.

On December 23, 1957, an American T-33 fighter jet violated Albanian airspace. Two MiG-15 aircraft took off from Kuçova Air Base, piloted by Anastas Ngjela and Mahmut Hysa.

The American fighter jet was surrounded and forced to land on the unfinished runway at Rinas Airport. The plane was impounded and the American pilot Major Howard J. Curran was arrested. Curran was released on January 11, 1958, while the plane was placed in the Gjirokastra castle museum.

References 

1957 in Albania
Cold War history of Albania
Albania–United States relations